HMS Artful is the third  nuclear-powered fleet submarine of the British Royal Navy. She is the second submarine of the Royal Navy to bear this name. Artful was ordered from GEC's Marconi Marine (now BAE Systems Submarine Solutions) on 17 March 1997, and was constructed at Barrow in Furness. She was named on 20 September 2013, was rolled out of the shipyard construction hall on 16 May 2014, and was due to start sea trials in early 2015. Artful made her first successful basin dive in October 2014, and sailed on 13 August 2015 for sea trials. Artful was handed over the Royal Navy on 14 December 2015, and commissioned on 18 March 2016.

Design

Propulsion
Artfuls nuclear reactor will not need to be refuelled during the boat's 25-year service. Since the submarine can purify water and air, she will be able to circumnavigate the planet without resurfacing. The main limit is that the submarine will only be able to carry three months' supply of food for 98 officers and ratings.

Armament
Artful has provision for up-to 38 weapons in six  torpedo tubes.

Common Combat System
Artful is the first Astute-class submarine to utilise the Common Combat System, which will be fitted on every Astute, Vanguard and Dreadnought-class submarine. The Common Combat System was originally meant to be first tested on the fourth Astute boat, but the system was completed ahead of time.

Operational history
In May 2021, Artful joined UK Carrier Strike Group 21 on its seven-and-a-half month-long maiden operational deployment to the Far East.

References

External links
Royal Navy HMS Artful (royalnavy.mod.uk)

Astute-class submarines
Ships built in Barrow-in-Furness
2014 ships
Submarines of the United Kingdom